Chaima Jouini (born 2 July 1996) is a Tunisian handball player for Club Africain and the Tunisian national team.

She participated at the 2015 World Women's Handball Championship.

References

1996 births
Living people
Tunisian female handball players
Place of birth missing (living people)
Mediterranean Games competitors for Tunisia
Competitors at the 2022 Mediterranean Games
20th-century Tunisian women
21st-century Tunisian women